Duncannon is a borough in Perry County, Pennsylvania, United States. The population was 1,473 at the 2020 census. It is part of the Harrisburg–Carlisle Metropolitan Statistical Area. The center of population of Pennsylvania is located in Duncannon. Lightning Guider Sleds were manufactured in Duncannon from 1904 until 1988. The Appalachian Trail makes its way through the town, going on various streets, and runs mainly along North High Street. It comes off the mountain at 40.3813, -77.0292 lat/long, onto Inn Road.

History
Duncannon was originally called Petersburg, and under the latter name was laid out in 1792. The present name is derived from Duncan's Island in the Susquehanna River.

The Puritan missionary David Brainerd visited the area in the 1740s. In his journal he describes his trip on the Susquehanna and his brief stay with an Indian tribe on Duncan's Island, across the river from present-day Duncannon.

The Mutzabaugh family has close connection to the town, as their market (now grocery store) named after the family has been a presence in the town since 1920, opening originally along the old railroad crossing between Market Square and High Street.

Geography
Duncannon is located at  (40.393986, -77.028891).

Demographics

As of the census of 2000, there were 1,508 people, 667 households, and 386 families residing in the borough. The racial makeup of the borough was 98.28% White, 0.53% African American, 0.07% Asian, 0.73% from other races, and 0.40% from two or more races. Hispanic or Latino of any race were 1.59% of the population.

There were 667 households, out of which 25.8% had children under the age of 18 living with them, 41.8% were married couples living together, 12.3% had a female householder with no husband present, and 42.1% were non-families. 36.1% of all households were made up of individuals, and 16.8% had someone living alone who was 65 years of age or older. The average household size was 2.26 and the average family size was 2.94.

In the borough the population was spread out, with 23.1% under the age of 18, 9.6% from 18 to 24, 28.7% from 25 to 44, 20.3% from 45 to 64, and 18.3% who were 65 years of age or older. The median age was 38 years. For every 100 females, there were 91.1 males. For every 100 females age 18 and over, there were 85.3 males.

The median income for a household in the borough was $33,000, and the median income for a family was $38,750. Males had a median income of $31,643 versus $21,477 for females. The per capita income for the borough was $15,883. About 6.2% of families and 8.5% of the population were below the poverty line, including 8.0% of those under age 18 and 8.2% of those age 65 or over.

Culture 
On S. Market Street, there is a mural with various artistic depictions of life and scenery in Duncannon, the entire area that is Perry County, Pennsylvania as a whole, and even of the entire United States.

A high percentage of the population is Christian, and many churches are in Duncannon, including a Lutheran, UCOC, Assembly of God, Presbyterian, Catholic, and Church of God. Many other churches, including multiple Methodist churches, are a few miles away.

Notable people 
 Amanda Clark, actress
 Marie Doro, silent screen actress
 Mollie Woods Hare, educator
 William J. Kirkpatrick, Christian musician and composer

Gallery

References

External links

Pennsylvania populated places on the Susquehanna River
Populated places established in 1792
Harrisburg–Carlisle metropolitan statistical area
Boroughs in Perry County, Pennsylvania
1844 establishments in Pennsylvania